The Village Community Co-operative was established in the City of Prospect near Adelaide, South Australia in the late 1970s. The co-operative was established as a multiple occupancy permaculture project at Kuipto Forest, south of Meadows. The community held fairs and meetings in town, field days and workshops at Kuipto and in Prospect.

The Co-operative was originally run from a house on Braund Rd, Prospect. The house had a shop front which was opened as The Village Store. This evolved into Village Natural Technology Systems with a focus on solar, wind, sustainable house design, permaculture, books and workshops.

Village Natural Technology Systems moved to Prospect Road, Prospect in the early 1980s and the Co-operative owned store was opened by the Honorable John Bannon, Premier of  South Australia, on November 26, 1983 

The Village Community Co-operative was also active in the anti-nuclear movement collaborating with CANE and Friends of the Earth to produce Your carry anywhere anti - uranium songbook for Australia.

References

Cooperatives in Australia
Permaculture organizations
Horticultural organisations based in Australia